Cindy Bouque (born 12 April 1975) is a former Belgian female shooter. She represented Belgium at the 1996 Summer Olympics and competed at the Women's 10 metre air rifle shooting event.

References 

1975 births
Living people
Olympic shooters of Belgium
Belgian female sport shooters
Shooters at the 1996 Summer Olympics
Sportspeople from Ghent
20th-century Belgian women